The Florida National Guard is the National Guard force of the state of Florida. It comprises the Florida Army National Guard and the Florida Air National Guard.

The United States Constitution charges the National Guard with dual federal and state missions. Ordinarily under the control of the state government (in which the governor is the commander-in-chief) pursuant to Title 32 of the United States Code, National Guard troops may also be called into active federal service with the United States Army or the United States Air Force (in which the president serves as commander-in-chief) and deployed worldwide with their active duty Army and Air Force counterparts.

The Florida National Guard, like those of other states, provides trained and equipped units for prompt mobilization in case of war or national emergency. Guardsmen may take part in functions ranging from limited actions in non-emergency situations to full-scale law enforcement (martial law) in cases when the governor determines that ordinary law enforcement officials can no longer maintain civil control. The state mission assigned to the National Guard is "to provide trained and disciplined forces for domestic emergencies or as otherwise provided by state law." The Florida National Guard serves as the state's "defense force".

Florida currently has a State Defense Force (SDF), reactivated as of 2022. During World War II, the Florida State Guard served as the official state defense force of Florida, and was organized as a stateside replacement for the Florida National Guard and executed the stateside duties of the National Guard for the duration of the war. National coordination of various state National Guard units are maintained through the National Guard Bureau.

Commanders

Army units

 Headquarters, Florida Army National Guard - St. Francis Barracks
 83rd Troop Command (Tallahassee)
 3/20th Special Forces Group (Camp Blanding Joint Training Center)
 HHC, 3/20th SFG
 Support Company
 153rd Finance Battalion (St. Augustine)
 1153rd Finance Detachment
 2153rd Finance Detachment 
 3153rd Finance Detachment
 111th Aviation Regiment (Jacksonville / Cecil Field)
 1-111th Aviation Regiment 
 2-111th Aviation Regiment (AOB) 
 171st Aviation Regiment
 Company B, 1st Battalion (Brooksville / Brooksville-Tampa Bay Regional Airport) 
 417th Signal Battalion (Composite)
 HHD
 144th Transportation Company (Marianna)
 708th General Support Maintenance (Quincy)
 653rd Range Extension Company (Crestview)
 53rd Infantry Brigade Combat Team 
 1-124th Infantry (South Florida)
 2-124th Infantry (Central Florida)
 1-153rd Cavalry (RSTA) (Panhandle of Florida)
 2-116th Field Artillery
753rd Brigade Engineer Battalion
164th Air Defense Artillery Brigade
 1-265th ADA (SHORAD)
 3-265th ADA (SHORAD)
 254th Transportation Battalion
 HHD 254th
 1218th Transportation Company
 806th Military Police Company (I/R)
 715th Military Police Company (CS)
 690th Military Police Company (I/R)
 3-116th Field Artillery
 FSC 3-116th
 50th Area Support Group
927th Combat Service Support Battalion
 32nd Army Air & Missile Defense Command - Detachment 1
 211th Infantry Regiment (Regional Training Institute, that offers the State OCS program)
 260th Military Intelligence Battalion
 13th Army Band
 146th Expeditionary Signal Battalion

Air Force units

 Headquarters, Florida Air National Guard - St. Francis Barracks
 125th Fighter Wing (125 FW) - Jacksonville Air National Guard Base 
 159th Fighter Squadron (159 FS)
 Detachment 1, 125th Fighter Wing - Homestead Air Reserve Base 
 601st Air and Space Operations Center (601 AOC) - Tyndall AFB
 325th Fighter Wing Associate Unit (325 FW AU) - Tyndall AFB
 202d RED HORSE Squadron (202 RHS) - Camp Blanding
 290th Joint Communications Support Squadron (290 JCSS) - MacDill AFB
 114th Space Control Squadron (114 SPCS) - Patrick Space Force Base & Cape Canaveral Space Force Station
 131st Training Flight (131 TF) - Camp Blanding
 159th Weather Flight (159 WF - Camp Blanding

Duties
National Guard units can be mobilized at any time by presidential order to supplement regular armed forces, and upon declaration of a state of emergency by the governor of the state in which they serve. Unlike Army Reserve and Air Force Reserve members, National Guard members cannot be mobilized individually (except through voluntary transfers and Temporary Duty Assignments TDA), but only as part of their respective units. However, since 11 September 2001 there have been a significant number of individual activations under Title 10 USC to support military operations (2001–Present); the legality of this policy has been a major issue within the National Guard.

Active duty callups

For much of the final decades of the twentieth century, National Guard personnel typically served "One weekend a month, two weeks a year", with a portion working for the Guard in a full-time capacity as either Active Guard and Reserve (AGR), Army Reserve Technicians or Air Reserve Technicians (ART).  This changed dramatically during the 1990-91 Gulf War, and continued on to present day, with both the Federal Reserve Components and the National Guard increasingly utilized as an "operational" force for worldwide deployment.

The current forces formation plans of the US Army call for the typical Army National Guard unit (or Army National Guardsman) to serve one year of active duty for every three years of service.  The US Air Force applies a similar utilization model for Air National Guard units (and Air National Guardsmen).

More specifically, previous Department of Defense policy was that no National Guardsman would be involuntarily activated for a total of more than 24 months (cumulative) in one six-year period. This policy has changed 1 August 2007, with the new policy stating that National Guard soldiers and airmen will be given 24 months between deployments of no more than 24 months; individual states have differing policies but remain subordinate to DoD policy).

As of 2020, the Florida National Guard was composed of approximately 10,000 soldiers and 1,900 airmen.

See also
 Florida Naval Militia

References

General sources 
 United States National Guard, accessed 4 November 2006
 Florida National Guard, accessed 20 November 2006
 Florida Army National Guard at GlobalSecurity.org
 Army National Guard page at GlobalSecurity.org
 Red Horse going to war.  16 Nov 2006 press release.

Citations

External links

 Bibliography of Florida Army National Guard History compiled by the United States Army Center of Military History
 Florida National Guard website

National Guard (United States)
Military in Florida
1861 establishments in Florida